Zaki Fatin Abdel Wahab (18 February 1961 – 20 March 2022) was an Egyptian actor and film director.

Biography
The son of the singer and actress Leila Mourad and film director Fatin Abdel Wahab was born on 18 February 1961. He graduated from the Directing Department of the Cairo Higher Institute of Cinema in 1983.

He worked as a second assistant director in the movie People on the Top (1981) and as an assistant director in many Youssef Chahine's films, including The Sixth Day (1986), in which he made his debut as an actor. In 1996, Zaki directed his feature film "Romantica", which was a biography of his life.

Personal life
Zaki married actress Soad Hosny, after she separated from the film director Ali Badrakhan. However, they separated after only a few months of marriage, and Zaki stated in more than one interview that the reason was his mother's opposition. He died on 20 March 2022 after a battle with lung cancer.

Selected filmography

Actor

Films
 The Sixth Day (1986) as Anwar Wagdy
 Alexandria Again and Forever (1989) as Guindi
 Mercedes (1993)
 I Love Cinema (2004)

Television 
  Ruby (TV series) (2012)

See also
 Cinema of Egypt
 List of Egyptian films of the 2000s

References

External links 
 

1961 births
2022 deaths
Egyptian male film actors
Egyptian male television actors
Male actors from Cairo
20th-century Egyptian male actors
21st-century Egyptian male actors
Film directors from Cairo
Cairo Higher Institute of Cinema alumni